The National Society of the Sons of the American Revolution (SAR or NSSAR) is an American congressionally chartered organization, founded in 1889 and headquartered in Louisville, Kentucky. A non-profit corporation, it has described its purpose as maintaining and extending "the institutions of American freedom, an appreciation for true patriotism, a respect for our national symbols, the value of American citizenship, [and] the unifying force of 'e pluribus unum' that has created, from the people of many nations, one nation and one people."

The members of the society are male descendants of people who served in the American Revolutionary War  or who contributed to establishing the independence of the United States. It is dedicated to perpetuating American ideals and traditions, and to protecting the Constitution of the United States; the official recognition of Constitution Day, Flag Day, and Bill of Rights Day were established through its efforts. It has members in the United States, Canada, France, Germany, Mexico, Spain, Switzerland, and the United Kingdom.

The organization is distinct from the Sons of the Revolution, a separate descendants heritage organization founded on February 22, 1876, by businessman John Austin Stevens and members of The Society of the Cincinnati. SAR Founder William Osborn McDowell disagreed with the Sons of the Revolution requirement at that time that all state societies were to be subordinate to the New York society.

History

The first organization of descendants of Revolutionary War patriots was established in San Francisco, California, in 1876. A group of men who were descendants of Revolutionary War veterans gathered to celebrate the centennial of the Declaration of Independence and the founding of the United States. They also wanted to honor the men and women who pledged their lives, fortunes, and livelihood to the striving for independence from Great Britain. This group formed an organization called the Sons of Revolutionary War Sires (SRWS). There is, however, no direct link between the SRWS and the SAR except that members of the SRWS were permitted to join the SAR after its founding in 1889.

The history of the SAR can be traced to the founding of the Sons of the Revolution, the New York Society which was organized in 1876. The SR was founded by John Austin Stevens who envisioned an aristocratic social and hereditary organization along the lines of the Society of the Cincinnati. In 1889 William Osborn McDowell, a New Jersey financier and businessman, organized the New Jersey Society of the Sons of the Revolution but was unwilling to accept the SR's requirement that other state societies be subordinate to the New York society. Furthermore, McDowell wanted the society to become more of a mass movement of descendants of Revolutionary patriots rather than an exclusive social club. As a result, McDowell organized the Sons of the American Revolution (SAR) at Fraunces Tavern in New York on April 30, 1889. This was the centennial for the inauguration of George Washington as the First President of the United States of America in 1789. SAR membership number 1 was assigned to McDowell. In addition to organizing the SAR, McDowell worked with six women to organize the National Society Daughters of the American Revolution on July 29, 1890.

The SAR was formally granted a congressional charter by an act of Congress under Title 36 of the United States Code on June 9, 1906. The act was signed by President Theodore Roosevelt, who was a member.

Membership
Membership in the society is open to any male of "good repute" who can prove lineal bloodline descent from an ancestor who actively supported the American Revolution. Acceptable ancestors include:
 military veterans of the American Revolutionary War, including those who served in the Continental Army, Continental Navy, and state militias and navies
 signers of the Declaration of Independence
 members of the Continental Congress
 civilians who provided arms or supplies to the American cause
 people who served on political bodies supporting the Revolution, signed oaths of allegiance, or those who gave similar support to the Patriot cause.
 Soldiers and sailors from allied nations such as France and Spain who fought in support of American independence.

No state society or chapter may discriminate against an applicant on the basis of race or creed. The SAR claims a membership of over 37,000 members in over 550 chapters representing all 50 states in the United States, as well as societies in Canada, France, Spain, Germany, Switzerland, and the United Kingdom. Overall, about 200,000 descendants have been admitted since the founding of the S.A.R. in 1890.

Governance

The governance of the Sons of the American Revolution is made up of 10 National (General) Officers, 15 Vice-Presidents that preside over separate geographical regions and a Trustee elected from each state and international society. These officers meet several times over the year to discuss business pertaining to the society. The National Officers meet at least four times during their term of office, unless special meetings are called. The Trustees meet twice each year at the Society's Headquarters in Louisville, Kentucky. These meetings, known as the Fall and Spring Leadership Meetings, are normally held in late September and early March. During the Leadership Meetings committee recommendations and the society's budget are approved. While only the National Officers, Vice-Presidents and Trustees have the right to vote on the floor, all SAR members are welcome to attend and may request appointment to committees. The National Officers and Trustees also meet during the National Congress held in late June or early July of each year. Unlike the Leadership Meetings which always take place at the Society's National Headquarters, the National Congress is held in different locations throughout the United States. Locations are often selected in order to honor a historical event in United States history or in the history of the SAR, and there is an effort to alternate the meetings between the Eastern and Western United States. The National Congress is responsible for electing the National Officers and approving changes to the Society's constitution, along with any other motions brought before it. In addition to the National Officers, Vice-Presidents and Trustees, State and International Society Presidents and specially elected delegates from each society also attend with voting privileges. The number of delegates are determined by each State or International Society's membership size.

In addition to the larger meetings previously listed, there are over 60 standing and special committees that SAR members are appointed to in order to oversee the Society's welfare. Some of these committees include: facilities, insurance, genealogy, library, merchandise, medals and awards. All SAR members are welcome to participate on committees and are appointed by the Society's President General for a one-year term. There are no term-limits and all committee members have the right to vote on the committee's decisions.

The President-General for 2022-2023 is Bruce Pickette, of Alabama.  He was sworn in as President-General at the 132nd National Congress in Savannah, GA. The executive director is Todd Bale.

Genealogical library
The National Society of the Sons of the American Revolution has held a collection of genealogical reference dating back to 1889. Materials were originally kept by the Secretary General or Registrar General up until 1926, when the materials were moved to the Registrar General's office in Washington, D.C., in 1927, this collection was moved to the recently purchased Sixteenth Street Headquarters Building, and the collection had grown to 914 books by 1933. From this point until the move of Headquarters from Washington, D.C., to Louisville, Kentucky, the book collection grew at a rapid pace, growing to approximately 25,000 items by 1988. At this point, the Library was on the Second floor of the Headquarters building on South Fourth Street, and possessed a 544-square-foot vault for books not out in the library due to space.

Because of continuing growth, the SAR Library was moved in 2010 to a renovated building on West Main Street in the heart of the Historic Museum District of downtown Louisville. By this point, the Library collection had grown to over 58,000 items, mostly covering the Revolutionary War period, but also containing other genealogical materials. The library collection includes family histories, state genealogy materials, federal censuses, Revolutionary War pension applications, and CD collections, and the library separates materials based on State. The library also provides access to online research databases, including Ancestry.com, Footnote.com, and Heritage Quest Online.

Merchandise
The society operates a merchandise department that sells items intended for both SAR members and the general public. Among the products available to the general public are: clothing apparel for men and women, Revolutionary War replicas such as Liberty Bells and field cannons, jewelry for men and women such as lapel pins and cuff links, along with cups, mugs, key-chains, books, CDs, videos and knickknacks. Items intended for SAR members only include: clothing, decals, license plate holders and frames, certificates and medals corresponding to SAR activities, medals designed to reward active and retired military personnel, firefighters, EMS, JROTC and ROTC, individuals involved in education, Eagle Scouts and many others.

The merchandise department is located on the lower level of the SAR Genealogical Library, located at 809 West Main Street, just across the street from the Louisville Slugger Museum & Factory.

Activities

The society is involved in historical research, raising funds for local scholarships and educational awards, and preservation of sites and documents related to the American Revolution. The SAR petitioned Congress to store Revolutionary era documents in a fire-proof area and make them available to the public, leading to the creation of the National Archives. It is also active in cataloging and marking Revolutionary War patriot graves and conducts an annual Eagle Scout scholarship program. The society is active in promoting "patriotism", and was instrumental in the establishment of Constitution Day.  Several SAR societies and chapters have active color guard groups that appear in various public and private venues as a means of community outreach.

The Sons of the American Revolution hosts two Leadership Meetings and one National Congress every year. The two leadership meetings are held in the Spring and Fall in Louisville, KY at the Brown Hotel. The National Congress is held at a different location every year during the Summer. The 2021 National Congress took place in Renton, Washington, while the 2022 Congress took place in Savannah, Georgia. The 2023 National Congress will take place in Orlando, Florida.

SAR national headquarters
The SAR's national headquarters, located along Museum Row in downtown Louisville, Kentucky, contains the organization's administrative staff offices, SAR Genealogical Research Library, and the future site of an American Revolutionary War Education Center. The SAR is currently raising funds to finish the center's development. The building houses original and copied art that commemorates important people and events of the Revolutionary War, as well as historical uniforms, flags, documents, and other colonial era pieces.

Symbolism of the SAR insignia
The SAR insignia consists of a Maltese cross surrounded by a garland, with a relief of George Washington in a center circle.

The Maltese cross used in the SAR Badge draws its inspiration from the cross used by the Order of St. Louis of France. The wreath symbolizes the laurel wreaths presented to worthy individuals by the Roman Republic. Major West selected the Cross of St. Louis as his basis for our decoration because King Louis XVI of France, the Grand Master of the Order of St. Louis, provided badly needed aid to the fledgling Continentals. In choosing this cross, the National Society intended to recognize the French contribution to American independence. 

History shows that the Maltese Cross was used by the Knights of St. John, a brotherhood of warrior Crusaders who represented all walks of life who banded together to fight for freedom and against oppression. The Knights of St. John, and other Crusaders, adopted the Maltese cross as their insignia because its eight points represented the eight Beatitudes prescribed in the Sermon on the Mount: blessed are (1) the poor in spirit, (2) the meek, (3) the pure, (4) the merciful, and (5) the peacemakers, (6) blessed are they that mourn, and (7) seek righteousness, and (8) blessed are they who are persecuted for righteousness sake.

Surrounding the relief of Washington in the center are the words "LIBERTAS ET PATRIA", a reminder of the United States Declaration of Independence and the United States Constitution.

The insignia is normally worn suspended by a ribbon of blue, white and gold (buff) on the wearer's left breast. National officers and former state and chapter presidents wear the insignia suspended from a neck ribbon of the Society's colors.

On other occasions a rosette in the Society's colors is worn on the wearers left lapel.

Notable SAR members

List of presidents-general of the Sons of the American Revolution
Edwin Seneca Greeley.jpg 

This is an incomplete list of the presidents-general of the Sons of the American Revolution. The first President General was Lucius Deming. There have been three Honorary President Generals named.  Four President Generals have died in office.

See also

 List of attractions and events in the Louisville metropolitan area
 List of hereditary and lineage organizations
 Society of the Cincinnati
 Daughters of the American Revolution
 Children of the American Revolution
 Military Order of the Loyal Legion of the United States
 Military Order of Foreign Wars
 General Society of Colonial Wars
 Sons of Confederate Veterans
 Sons of Union Veterans
 The United Empire Loyalists' Association of Canada

References

External links

 
 

 
1889 establishments in New York (state)
American Revolution veterans and lineage organizations
Lineage societies
Military and war museums in Kentucky
Museums in Louisville, Kentucky
Non-profit organizations based in Kentucky
Organizations established in 1889
Patriotic and national organizations chartered by the United States Congress